Edwin Brainard may refer to:
 Edwin H. Brainard (1882–1957), United States Marine Corps officer
 J. Edwin Brainard (1857–1942), Lieutenant governor of Connecticut